Bojan Mihajlović may refer to:

 Bojan Mihajlović (footballer, born 1973), Serbian football midfielder
 Bojan Mihajlović (footballer, born 1988), Bosnian-Herzegovinian football defender